Leung So Kee Umbrella Factory is the most famous umbrella manufacturer and retailer in Hong Kong.

The history of Leung So Kee can be traced back to 1885, when its first shop was opened in Guangzhou by Leung So (梁蘇). Leung So Kee was famous for its steel-frame umbrellas and lifelong guarantee. The current owner of Leung So Kee is Leung Man Shing (梁孟誠), the great grandchild of Leung So (梁蘇).

History 
Leung So Kee Umbrella Factory was founded in 1885 (or 1886, according to some sources) in Huiai Xilu, Guangzhou (廣州惠愛西路) by Leung So (梁蘇). Mr Leung imported materials overseas to manufacture western style umbrellas which cost about a half-month salary of an average worker at that time.

In 1920, the first branch of Leung So Kee was opened in Guangzhou. A branch was opened in Macau in 1923.

In 1941, the first branch of Leung So Kee in Hong Kong was opened in Hong Kong Island by the sixth son of Mr. Leung. The second branch in Hong Kong was opened in 1944.

In 1950, following the Chinese Communist Revolution, the whole family business moved to Hong Kong. Business was brisk, with the company selling 20,000 umbrellas a year in the 1950s. The durability of their products earned the firm contracts with the Urban Services Department, Hong Kong Telephone, and Hong Kong Tramways.

Business declined over the 1960s and 1970s with the import of cheap, well-made umbrellas from places like Japan. The second-generation owner of the firm, Leung Shuk-ming, responded by moving toward higher prices and better quality, dropping out of the low-priced market entirely. His son Leung Chun-fat, the third-generation owner of the company, regarded this as a poor commercial decision, stating that profits declined and the company merely broke even after 1972. Leung Chun-fat, an architect, retired in 1986, leaving the brand to his nephew, who managed the umbrella factory in Kowloon.

In 1994, the flagship shop of Leung So Kee was opened in Dragon Centre, Sham Shui Po.

In 2006, the branch of Leung So Kee was opened in Sha Tin Centre, Sha Tin when its shop in New Town Plaza, Sha Tin was closed.

Products and services 
Leung So Kee sells a wide range of umbrellas, from sun umbrella to mini folding umbrella. It offers custom-made umbrella services, which took about four hours to finish. The most expensive umbrella sold by Leung So Kee costs HK$1,080. The umbrellas of Leung So Kee are now partly made by machines. Leung So Kee still provide a lifetime warranty on its umbrella frames.

In the 1960s to 1970s, Leung So Kee had several retail shops in Hong Kong, including one in Mong Kok. Leung So Kee currently only has two retail shops in Hong Kong. They are located at Sha Tin Centre, Sha Tin and Dragon Centre, Sham Shui Po.

In popular culture
 A drama film called The Umbrella Story (人間有情) was written by Raymond To and based on the story of Leung So Kee. 
 The drama was later made into a film of the same title, and was directed and produced by Clifton Ko. 
 There was also a stage play performed based on the script written by Raymond To.
 In the 1991 Hong Kong martial arts film Once Upon a Time in China (黃飛鴻), written and directed by Tsui Hark, the main character Wong Fei-hung was seen using an umbrella as a weapon in a fight. The umbrella was manufactured by Leung So Kee.

References

External links

 

Manufacturing companies of Hong Kong
Manufacturing companies established in 1885
Retail companies established in 1920